Luciotrichus is a genus of fungi in the family Pyronemataceae. A monotypic genus, it contains the single species Luciotrichus lasioboloides.

External links
Index Fungorum

Pyronemataceae
Monotypic Ascomycota genera